WCBS may refer to:

 WCBS (AM), a radio station (880 AM) licensed to New York, New York, United States
 WCBS-FM, a radio station (101.1 FM) licensed to New York, New York, United States
 WCBS-TV, a television station (PSIP 2/RF 36) licensed to New York, New York, United States
 World Confederation of Billiards Sports